Association Football Club Tsarsko Selo 2015, commonly referred to as Tsarsko Selo, was a Bulgarian association football club based in Sofia. It played in First League, the top tier of the Bulgarian football league system.

Tsarsko Selo played their home matches at their Tsarsko Selo Sports Complex in the Dragalevtsi quarter of Sofia.

History

2015–2016: Foundation
In the summer of 2015, the previous chairman of CSKA Sofia Stoyne Manolov established a new academy called Football Academy Tsarsko Selo, with a focus on scouting and developing youth football players born in 2002 to 2010. The club was initially registered and a subsequent men's team in the A RFG Sofia South was established, with former long-time CSKA Sofia captain Todor Yanchev appointed as manager. On November 12, 2015 Manolov announced an academy partnership with Spanish La Liga club Málaga CF. In the end of December 2015, Todor Yanchev took over Sofia 2010, which was bought by Manolov and was merged with Tsarsko Selo to establish a new club called Tsarsko Selo Sofia.

2016–2022: Professional levels

On 28 July 2016 the team was accepted in the newly created Bulgarian Second Professional League. They finished their first match against Botev Galabovo with a draw. In their first match for the Bulgarian Cup they played against Levski Sofia. The match was played on 22 September 2016 at the Lokomotiv Stadium in Sofia and was won by Levski by 2–0. After 2 heavy defeats, Yanchev stepped down from his position as a manager and on 29 October 2016, previous Cherno More Varna head coach Nikola Spasov was announced as the new manager of the team. The team finished their first season in Second League in 5th place.

The good start of the season for Tsarsko Selo was marked not only by the first place in the league after 8 rounds, but with their first win for the Cup, winning the first round against Neftochimic Burgas on 19 September 2017. On 3 January 2018 Nikola Spasov was announced as the new manager of the Kazakhstan Premier League team Kyzylzhar. Shortly the same day Veselin Velikov was announced as the new manager of the club. On 8 May 2018 Velislav Vutsov was announced as the new head coach of the team with Velikov becoming a selectionist.

On 22 April 2019 in a goalless draw against CSKA 1948 the kings secured their first place in Second League and won promotion in the First League for first time in their history, being 18 points ahead from the second and third place five rounds before the end of the season.

Tsarsko selo's first ever match in the Bulgarian First Division resulted in a 0–2 away loss against the actual champion Ludogorets Razgrad. This was followed by a home 0–0 draw to the other debutant Arda Kardzhali. Tsarsko selo's first win came in the fifth round, when the team managed to beat Botev Plovdiv away with 0–2. Two goals for the win were scored by Dutch winger Rodney Antwi. The first home win came in the seventh round with 2–1 against Beroe Stara Zagora. Tsarsko Selo eventually finished 13th, having to play a playoff match in order to remain in the elite. They were drawn against the second-placed team from the Second League, Septemvri Sofia. In a very close fought game played in Sofia, Tsarsko Selo won 2–0, securing their place in the First League for the next season.

In January 2022 an Italian Private Investment company joined the club leadership. On 21 May 2022, in the last match of the season, Tsarsko Selo were awarded a penalty that could secure them the win. Yusupha Yaffa decided to take the penalty despite Martin Kavdanski being the regular penalty taker. Yaffa was ready to take the penalty when the owner of the team, Stoyne Manolov, entered the pitch and fought with him. He left the pitch and Kavdanski took the penalty, but it was saved. On the next day, Manolov announced that the team won't be participating in the league next season and will end their existence.

Honours
Second League:
  Winners (1): 2018–19
  Third Place (1): 2017–18
Fourth League:
  Runners up (1): 2015–16
Bulgarian Cup:
 Round of 16 (2): 2017–18, 2020–21

Shirt and sponsor
Tsarsko Selo's main kit was initially red and white and the away kits were black and red. From 2016, the main kit has been all-red, while the reserve ones are all-white. In 2017 team main kit was changed to pink.

Records and notable stats

Players in bold are still playing for Tsarsko Selo.

Notable players

The footballers enlisted below have international caps for their respective countries, have more than 100 caps, or hold a record for Tsarsko Selo. Players whose name is listed in bold represented their countries.
 

Bulgaria
 Lachezar Baltanov
 Ivan Bandalovski
 Ivan Čvorović
 Reyan Daskalov
 Svetoslav Dikov
 Boris Galchev
 Antonio Georgiev
 Ventsislav Hristov
 Mihail Ivanov
 Yanis Karabelyov
 Georgi Minchev
 Veselin Minev
 Yordan Minev
 Boyan Peykov
 Ventsislav Vasilev

Europe
 Artur Crăciun
 Rodney Antwi
 Dylan Mertens
 Alen Stevanović

Africa
 Dylan Bahamboula
 Gaëtan Missi Mezu
 Yassine Amrioui

The Americas
 Wesley Natã
 Johny Placide

Asia
 Khair Jones'''

Past seasons

Manager history

References

External links
Official website 
bgclubs.eu

Defunct football clubs in Bulgaria
Association football clubs established in 2015
Association football clubs disestablished in 2022
2015 establishments in Bulgaria
2022 disestablishments in Bulgaria